Jarl is a noble title in Scandinavian countries. 

Jarl may also refer to:

 Birger Jarl (1210–1266), ruler of Sweden and founder of Stockholm
 Haakon Jarl (937–995), ruler of Norway
 Ríg-Jarl or Jarl, a son of the god Ríg in Norse mythology
 Jarl (name), a list of people named Jarl
 "Jarl", a catchphrase used by Spanish stand-up comedian Chiquito de la Calzada

See also
 Japan Amateur Radio League (JARL)